The 1988 Detroit Grand Prix was a Formula One motor race held on June 19, 1988 in Detroit, Michigan. It was the sixth race of the 1988 Formula One season.

Summary

Qualifying
Ayrton Senna's third win of the season made it six out of six for McLaren in 1988, on the way to an unprecedented 15 wins and ten 1-2 finishes in 16 races. Senna's victory matched the season total of teammate Alain Prost, who finished 38 seconds behind the Brazilian in second place. Thierry Boutsen took third for Benetton, as he had a week before in Canada, and Andrea de Cesaris scored the first points ever for the Rial team by finishing fourth. Minardi also scored their first point with Pierluigi Martini's sixth place.

With turbocharged engines scheduled to be eliminated prior to 1989, and their effectiveness intended to be curtailed by two rule changes for 1988, few teams opted to develop totally new equipment that would only be used for one season. Only Honda, who defected to McLaren from defending Constructor's Champion Williams, and Ferrari developed new engines to meet the revised turbo rules– boost reduced from 4 bars to 2.5, and fuel capacity reduced from 195 liters to 150 (refueling was banned from 1984 through 1993), and only McLaren developed a completely new chassis. Though the new rules were intended to narrow or eliminate the performance gap between the turbos and the normally aspirated engines, Honda and Ferrari were able to display a  advantage over the best 3.5-liter equipment of the opposition. With that kind of power differential, the only new chassis in the field, and Senna and Prost behind the wheel, McLaren quickly turned the season into a two-man show.

Detroit's tight 90-degree turns and short straight sections had given the underpowered "atmo" cars a chance at several times during the turbo era, and some teams were hoping that the circuit would offer them a chance. Senna took the 22nd pole of his career by more than eight-tenths of a second, but the Ferraris of Gerhard Berger and Michele Alboreto both lined up ahead of Prost, who was fourth and openly admitted that he simply did not like the circuit. The teams were all hoping for cooler temperatures for the race on Sunday, after the track had begun to break up during qualifying, expedited by a Trans-Am race on Saturday. There was a push from the F1 teams to have the Trans-Am race cancelled, but with that series having guaranteed television coverage of each round (of which Detroit was a part), the race went ahead and as feared, the powerful, heavy saloons tore the track surface up even more. Hasty concrete repairs made the surface extremely abrasive for the soft compound tires most teams had brought, and teams were forced to reconsider their plans for a non-stop race. On Sunday morning, Berger said, "Really, I think today is a lottery.... which probably gives us our best chance of the season."

Ivan Capelli broke a bone in his left foot when he crashed into the pit wall during Saturday practice, having set a time in Friday qualifying that would have put him 21st on the grid. Nicola Larini was thus promoted to the last grid spot.

Race
In front of 61,000 fans on race day, Senna took the lead off the grid. The Ferraris held onto second and third before Prost got by Alboreto on lap 5, and Berger on lap 6. By then, Senna was over six seconds ahead.

On lap 7 Boutsen, having already passed Alboreto, attempted to pass Berger as well, but his Benetton hit the Ferrari's left rear wheel and punctured the tire, sending Berger into retirement. Two laps later, Boutsen's team-mate Alessandro Nannini collided with Alboreto while trying to overtake him. Both cars continued, but on lap 15 Nannini pitted with a damaged right front suspension and failing brakes. Alboreto continued until lap 46 when he spun off, having worked his way back up to seventh.

The collisions enabled Nigel Mansell to move up to fourth in the Williams, only for his Judd engine to fail on lap 19. Team-mate Riccardo Patrese assumed the position until lap 27, when he suffered an electrical failure.

Any hope of a threat to the McLarens was gone. The red and white cars, with Senna eight seconds ahead, seemed to be carefree. In fact, Prost had been struggling the entire race with an uncooperative gearchange. "It was strange– the gearbox felt as though it was seizing up. The worst change was from fourth to fifth, which I think I missed at least once a lap right the way through."

Pierluigi Martini, driving in his first Grand Prix in almost three years, was running extremely well for Minardi and got up to fifth place on lap 35 when Maurício Gugelmin's March retired. He would likely have finished there, if not for the relentless and resilient performance of Jonathan Palmer for Tyrrell. Palmer had come together with Stefano Modena in the EuroBrun on the first lap, requiring a stop to replace the nosecone, and leaving him dead last by a sizable margin. By lap 47, he had worked his way into the points, and in the closing laps, he was the fastest car on the circuit. Palmer's two points for fifth place were his reward for what was probably the most impressive performance of the race.Senna and Prost both had time to make leisurely stops for new tires, and Senna went on to lead all 63 laps. Prost finished nearly 40 seconds behind Senna, despite setting the fastest lap of the race on lap 4; no other drivers finished on the lead lap. Prost said, "Over the years I've developed a style of driving which involves braking into the apex of a corner. I don't think most of the guys do that, but it works for me. On this surface today, though, it was impossible to do it without simply sliding straight on. So I had to change my whole way of driving, brake carefully in a straight line, then turn in. No excuse, you understand, but it meant adapting, doing something which isn't my natural style."

The drivers became outspoken about their dislike of the race. Senna likened the last laps to driving in heavy rain as the track had broken up so badly, while he, Prost and Boutsen argued that if Formula One wanted to stay in Detroit, it needed to move elsewhere in the city. Even though there were some negotiations to move the event to another street circuit on nearby Belle Isle, these plans ultimately fell through, and thus this was the last Formula One Detroit Grand Prix. For the next three years, F1 raced at a street circuit in Phoenix, Arizona, in an event officially known as the United States Grand Prix.

The Detroit street circuit hosted three CART races in 1989, 1990 and 1991 (the unpopular chicane before the pits being removed), before CART moved to the Belle Isle circuit in 1992.

Classification

 Pre-qualifying 

Qualifying

Race

Championship standings after the race

Drivers' Championship standings

Constructors' Championship standings

 

References

Further reading
 Nigel Roebuck (June 23, 1988). "Detroit GP: Makes You Six!". Autosport'', 30-41.

Detroit Grand Prix
Detroit Grand Prix
Detroit Grand Prix
Detroit Grand Prix